The Zimbabwean cricket team toured Bangladesh in January 2009, participating in the Tri-Series in Bangladesh in 2008-09, winning its only tour match against a Bangladesh Cricket Board Academy team and winning one of the three One Day International's (ODI's) against the Bangladesh national cricket team.

Tour Matches

Only Tour match

Tri-Nation Series
For the results of the Tri-Nation Series, please see Tri-Series in Bangladesh in 2008-09

ODI series

1st ODI

2nd ODI

3rd ODI

Heavy fog delayed the start of play, so the match was reduced to 37 overs per team.

References

International cricket competitions in 2008–09
2009 in Bangladeshi cricket
2008-09
Bangladeshi cricket seasons from 2000–01
2009 in Zimbabwean cricket